W. J. "Jim" Estelle Unit (E2, originally the Ellis II Unit) also known as the Estelle Supermax Penitentiary, is a prison located on Farm to Market Road 3478 in unincorporated Walker County, Texas, United States,  north of central Huntsville. The unit, which opened in June 1984, was named after Ward James "Jim" Estelle, a former prison director of Texas.

The Estelle Unit has a geriatric facility, a program for physically handicapped inmates, a program for substance abuse, a high security unit, and a regional medical facility. The Estelle High Security Unit, the high security unit, is a supermax facility. The current warden is Michael Britt, appointed in November, 2022.

History

The unit opened in 1984. The Estelle High Security Unit was designed in response to an increase in prison violence in the Texas prison system.

Around 1991 TDCJ planned to build a separate facility for elderly inmates. In 1995 the unit received its current name. In 1999, a prisoner named Clifford Dwayne Jones escaped by slipping one of his hands out of a pair of handcuffs and then scaling several walls. The inmate left behind his clothes and shoes, possibly to foil tracking dogs. The inmate was captured about 48 hours after his escape. Jones's escape was the first escape from the high security unit.

On May 12, 2010 Thord "Catfish" Dockray, a prisoner with a history of mental illness, threw urine on correctional officers. Officers ordered him to exit his cell, but he refused. The officers utilized chemical agents to try to subdue Dockray, but he continued his assault. After Dockray was subdued, medics attended to Dockray, who refused medical care. On May 13 the prisoner was found face down in his cell. The prisoner was taken to Huntsville Memorial Hospital, where he died.

As of 2010 a study by the Bureau of Justice Statistics stated that the percentage of prisoners who were sexually abused within the preceding year was 15.7% at Estelle. The BJS surveyed inmates in hundreds of state and federal prisons and county jails. Nationwide, the rate of inmates reporting sexual victimization within a prior 12-month period was 4.5 percent. The Estelle rate was the highest in the U.S.

Two correctional officers secretly allowed three inmates to fight each other on April 29, 2015 and attempted to cover up the act. They later confessed and were given prison sentences.

Operations
The area housing the Ellis and Estelle units is wooded.

The Estelle High Security Unit is a self-contained facility north of the main Estelle prison facility. The high security unit was the first of the Texas Department of Criminal Justice's "super seg" units, which have many administrative segregation cells. The security unit houses many of the most violent male prisoners in the State of Texas. The security unit also houses prisoners who purposefully cause problems in order to escape from the general population for fear of victimization.

Notable inmates
Current:
Bernie Tiede
Faryion Wardrip
Former:
 Cesar Fierro
 Steven Jay Russell
Yaser Said

References

External links

 Estelle Unit - Texas Department of Criminal Justice
 Estelle Unit at INPM - International Network of Prison Ministries
 Estelle Unit Does It All—And Then Some - National Commission on Correctional Health Care
 List of prisoners in the Estelle Unit - The Texas Observer

Prisons in Walker County, Texas
1984 establishments in Texas